Karl Olutokun Toriola is a Nigerian business leader. He is the Chief Executive Officer of MTN Nigeria.

Background 
Toriola holds a Bachelor of Science degree in Electronic and Electrical Engineering from Obafemi Awolowo University, Ile-Ife, Nigeria and a Master of Science degree in communication systems from University of Wales, Swansea, UK. 

He worked at Ericsson Nigeria in 2000 as Support and Integration Manager and moved to Econet Nigeria in 2003 as Deputy Chief Technical officer rising to become Chief Operations Officer at then Vmobile Nigeria (now Airtel).
In 2006 Toriola joined MTN Nigeria as Chief Technical Officer. He was appointed CEO of MTN
Congo Brazzaville in 2011 and subsequently, CEO MTN Cameroon in the same year. He went
on to become Vice President of MTN Group's WECA (West and Central Africa) for 5 years until
he was announced CEO of MTN Nigeria in October 2020.

He is a Fellow of the Nigerian Society of Engineers, a member of the Council for the Regulation of Engineering in Nigeria, and the Institute of Directors. He is on the 12th Governing Council of the Lagos State University, Nigeria.

References 

Year of birth missing (living people)
Living people
Nigerian business executives
Obafemi Awolowo University alumni
Alumni of Swansea University
Ericsson people